Justin Jesse Price (1930 – 12 March 2011) was an American mathematician, known for several textbooks and contributions to his field.

His Ph.D. dissertation at the University of Pennsylvania was I.  Some Duality Theorems  II.  On the Characters of Certain Compact Abelian Groups advised by Nathan Fine (1956). Price participated in a research project for the Air Force (1956–58) and joined the faculty at Cornell University as associate professor (1958–63). In 1963 he became professor at Purdue University, retiring in 2004.

Price's research was in real analysis and orthogonal functions. In fact, his article on convergence of incomplete sets of orthogonal functions merited award from Mathematical Association of America.

He had sabbaticals and stays at Paris, University College London, University of California, Berkeley and Harvard University. Several educational textbooks were collaborations with Purdue colleague Harley Flanders (see this for booklist).

Awards
 1976 L. R. Ford award from Mathematical Association of America for excellence in expository writing and a paper on Orthogonal Functions 
 1994 Mathematical Association of America Distinguished College or University Teaching award.

References

1930 births
2011 deaths
20th-century American mathematicians
21st-century American mathematicians
University of Pennsylvania alumni
Cornell University faculty
Purdue University faculty
Academic staff of the University of Paris
Academics of University College London
Harvard University staff
University of California, Berkeley faculty